Nelly Jeanne "Nell" Ginjaar-Maas (7 May 1931 – 24 April 2012) was a Dutch politician of the People's Party for Freedom and Democracy (VVD) and teacher.

Ginjaar-Maas was born in Rotterdam, and was for 9 years a member of the House of Representatives of the Netherlands for the People's Party for Freedom and Democracy. Ginjaar-Maas was married to minister Leendert Ginjaar. Ginjaar-Maas died on 24 April 2012 on the island of Corsica.

Decorations

References

External links

Official
  Drs. N.J. (Nell) Ginjaar-Maas Parlement & Politiek

 

1931 births
2012 deaths
Commanders of the Order of Orange-Nassau
20th-century Dutch chemists
Dutch nonprofit directors
Leiden University alumni
Members of the House of Representatives (Netherlands)
People from Goes
Politicians from Rotterdam
People's Party for Freedom and Democracy politicians
State Secretaries for Education of the Netherlands
20th-century Dutch educators
20th-century Dutch women politicians
20th-century Dutch politicians